The Starcevich Monument or Beaufort Australian Monument is a monument in the town of Beaufort in Sabah, Malaysia dedicated to Tom Starcevich from the 9th Division Army of Australia during the reconquest of the town by the Allied forces on 28 June 1945.

History 

In June 1945, after a series landings of Australian forces on the Brunei Bay, the Australian troops preparing their attack and continued to recaptured Labuan, Muara Besar, Brunei Town, Weston and Beaufort. The first battalion from 2/32nd landed in Weston on 16 June but found the area has already been left by the Japanese. Other battalions followed in the next day when parts of the 2/43rd Battalion and 2/11th Commando Squadron landed at Mempakul. After a series of reconnaissance, the Australian found soon the Japanese had located their base in Beaufort. The Australian 2/32nd and 2/43rd Battalion began their attack on 27 June against the 386th Japanese Independent Infantry Battalion under Major Kimura Jiro.

On evening 27 June, most of the 2/43rd Battalion already fought their way into the town, while the others remained outside the town to cut off any enemy escape route. The following morning, a unit of Australians during a patrol at a nearest jungle was already under heavy machine gun fire from the Japanese. One of the Australian soldier, Tom Starcevich later led two counter-attacks and destroyed the enemy positions by using his Bren machine gun. For his bravery, Starcevich was awarded with the Victoria Cross.

A monument later erected by the citizens of Beaufort as a gratitude to the Australian forces for liberating the town. The monument in the form of a memorial stone was originally located in the front of a police station.

Inscription 
The monument is in the form of a stele of about one metre in height. The cross section is rectangular; the stele tapers upward slightly and is topped by a flat top. On the front with a metal sheet been inserted and the inscription is in English:

Starcevich died in November 1989 at the age of 71 years in Western Australia. At the suggestion of his World War II comrades Stanley Toomey, another smaller metal plate was used in June 1990. Under the regimental character "T" and the coat of arms of the Australian Imperial Force is the inscription:

References 

Monuments and memorials in Sabah